Saraylı can refer to:

 Saraylı, Bartın
 Saraylı, Çorum